Gow Langsford Gallery is an art gallery in Auckland, New Zealand. The gallery was established in 1987 by John Gow and Gary Langsford. Gow Langsford represents and has represented many significant New Zealand and international artists, including Max Gimblett, Jacqueline Fahey, Paul Dibble and Dick Frizzell.

Although Gow Langsford Gallery is often associated with John Leech Gallery, whose origins can be traced back to the mid-19th century, the former was created as a separate venture and with a different purpose in mind.

History

Gary Langsford and John Gow and jointly founded Gow Langsford Gallery in 1987 in a disused petrol station in Grey Lynn. The gallery has been in several locations since its inception in 1987; Richmond Road, Auckland (1987 – 1990), The Strand, Auckland (1990 – 1992), Kitchener St, Auckland (1993 – current), Danks St, Sydney (2002 – 2004) Lorne St, Auckland (2008 – 2021) and is now solely based in its flagship premises on Kitchener St, directly opposite the Auckland Art Gallery. Over the past three decades Gow Langsford has mounted more than 500 exhibitions around the country and many abroad. In the years leading up to the 2020 global pandemic the gallery was participating actively in international art fairs and regularly showing at Art Basel Hong Kong and Sydney Contemporary.

Both Gow and Langsford pioneered the changing landscape of the New Zealand art world and have emerged as well-respected leaders of the local arts community. As well as building an audience for local art, Gow Langsford presents museum-quality exhibitions by significant international artists, often providing an opportunity to see works not previously exhibited in New Zealand. Although a commercial place of business, all exhibitions are free to the public and many are accompanied by free exhibitions catalogues.

Gow Langsford Gallery celebrated their 30th anniversary in 2017. Founding Directors John Gow and Gary Langsford were both appointed Members of the New Zealand Order of Merit in the 2018 New Year Honours. Long serving gallery manager Anna Jackson became director of the gallery in 2015 and co-owner in 2020.

The gallery has been more than a vocation for the directors who are passionate advocates for the Visual Arts and committed to the development of the careers of the artists they represent. Through their dedication they have fostered the growth of contemporary art in New Zealand and enabled the careers of many of this country's most notable artists. Among them are Max Gimblett (ONZM), Paul Dibble (MNZM), John Pule (ONZM), Judy Millar, Dick Frizzell (MNZM), Karl Maughan, Shane Cotton (ONZM) and the late Tony Fomison (1939–1990) and Allen Maddox (1948–2000). Gow Langsford Gallery's stable of represented artists is now composed primarily of established artists from Australasia, but has also attracted artists from Europe and America. Furthermore, the Gallery brings in and mentors the next generation of artists. This includes sponsorship for an annual Gow Langsford Gallery Art Prize, awarded to an outstanding recent Visual Arts graduate who has demonstrated excellence and resilience in their field.

Present

Gow Langsford is located in central Auckland directly opposite the Auckland Art Gallery. It represents both new and established artists and has mounted around 500 exhibitions since it opened its doors. Through their constant and varied exhibitions, Gow Langsford wishes to expose their artists to different types of audiences, hence, providing a forum for contemporary art on both the local and international scene.

Gow Langsford's recent exhibitions included works by several notable artists: Jacqueline Fahey, Tony Cragg, Max Gimblett, Dale Frank, and John Pule.

Represented artists

James Cousins
Tony Cragg
David McCracken
Max Gimblett
Laurence Aberhart
Grace Wright
Katharina Grosse
Dale Frank
Simon Ingram
John Pule
Judy Millar
Darryn George
Hugo Koha Lindsay
Jacqueline Fahey
Jono Rotman
Paul Dibble
Dick Frizzell
Graham Fletcher
Lisa Roet
Virginia Leonard
John Walsh
Michael Hight
Alex Monteith
Reuben Paterson
Gregor Kregar
Chris Heaphy
Antonio Murado
Bernar Venet
André Hemer
Allen Maddox
Sara Hughes
Karl Maughan

References

External links
 

Art museums and galleries in Auckland
Buildings and structures in Auckland
Tourist attractions in Auckland
Auckland CBD